2010 World Championships may refer to:
 Aquatics: 2010 FINA World Swimming Championships (25 m)
 Athletics: 2010 IAAF World Indoor Championships
Cross-country running: 2010 IAAF World Cross Country Championships
Half marathon: 2010 IAAF World Half Marathon Championships
 Badminton: 2010 BWF World Championships
 Basketball:
 2010 FIBA World Championship
 2010 FIBA World Championship for Women
 Chess: World Chess Championship 2010
 Curling: 
2010 World Men's Curling Championship
2010 Ford World Women's Curling Championship
2010 World Mixed Doubles Curling Championship
 Darts: 2010 BDO World Darts Championship
 Darts: 2010 PDC World Darts Championship
 Figure skating: 2010 World Figure Skating Championships
 Fencing: 2010 World Fencing Championships
 Gymnastics
 Artistic Gymnastics 2010 World Artistic Gymnastics Championships
 Rhythmic Gymnastics 2010 World Rhythmic Gymnastics Championships
 Men's Lacrosse: 2010 World Lacrosse Championship
 Ice hockey: 2010 Men's World Ice Hockey Championships
 Ringette: 2010 World Ringette Championships
 Speed skating:
Allround: 2010 World Allround Speed Skating Championships
Sprint: 2010 World Sprint Speed Skating Championships
 Snooker: 2010 World Snooker Championship
 Table tennis: 2010 World Team Table Tennis Championships
 Volleyball:
 2010 FIVB Men's World Championship
 2010 FIVB Women's World Championship
 Wheelchair basketball: 2010 Wheelchair Basketball World Championship

See also
 2010 World Cup (disambiguation)
 2010 Continental Championships (disambiguation)
 2010 World Junior Championships (disambiguation)